The Kasalka Range is a subrange of the Tahtsa Ranges, located between Tahtsa Lake and Troitsa Lake in northern British Columbia, Canada.

References

Kasalka Range in the Canadian Mountain Encyclopedia

Hazelton Mountains